Feras Saied (January 17, 1981 – June 6, 2015) was a professional Syrian bodybuilder.

Biography 
Feras Saied was originally from Homs, a city in western Syria that is being held under the regime's control. As a revolutionary, Saied took part in a few demonstrations with his friends and fellow athletes. This led to his capture by the authorities, and the brutal torture he was subjected to. Imprisoned, he was bestially "punished" for being an activist opposed to the Assad regime. In an interview Saied recalled, "My body was strong enough to take the torture, but the real problem remained in the humiliation that I couldn't take." He was also a member of Syrian military forces.

Saied was the winner or finalist of many bodybuilding competitions, organized at national and worldwide levels. In 2000, he won the IFBB Arab Championships, in the junior category. The same year he placed third at IFBB World Championships, also as a junior. Saied went on to win such contests as the 2006 IFBB Ludus Maximus Championships, 2009 IFBB Gran Prix One Way Fitness, 2009 IFBB Italian Championships, and 2010 IFBB World Amateur Championships. He placed second at the 2011 IFBB Olympia Amateur, in the super heavyweight category. Nicknamed "The Lion," he became a professional IFBB bodybuilder in 2011. Saied earned his IFBB Pro Card after winning the '11 IFBB Arnold Classic Europe Amateur. He was the overall winner of the 2011 IFBB 19 Grand Prix Due Torri championships. He also placed second at the IFBB California State Pro championships in 2015. His competition weight was 282 lbs (128 kg).

Saied, a Muslim, lived in Fondi (Italy) for several years. He then left Italy, and moved to Dubai.  He died in a motorcycle accident in Dubai on June 6, 2015.

Partial contest history 
 2000: IFBB Arab Championships − 1st place in junior category
 2000: IFBB World Championships − 3rd place in junior category
 2002: IFBB World Amateur Championships − 5th place in heavy weight
 2006: IFBB Ludus Maximus Championships (Italy) − 1st place
 2007: IFBB Mediterranean Championships − 2nd place
 2009: IFBB Gran Prix One Way Fitness − 1st place in super heavyweight and overall
 2009: IFBB Italian Championships − 1st place in super heavyweight and overall
 2010: IFBB Notte dei Campioni − 1st place in 90 kg+ category
 2010: 18 Gran Prix Due Torri − 1st place in super heavyweight and overall
 2010: IFBB World Amateur Championships − 1st place overall
 2011: IFBB Olympia Amateur − 2nd place in super heavyweight
 2011: IFBB Arnold Classic Europe Amateur − 1st place in super heavyweight and overall
 2011: 19 Grand Prix Due Torri − 1st place in super heavyweight and overall
 2012: FIBO Power Pro − 5th place
 2012: Mr. Europe Pro − 4th place
 2012: Arnold Classic Europe Pro − 10th place
 2015: IFBB California State Pro − 2nd place

Filmography 
 2014: Syria Untold (documentary)

Notes

References

External links 
 Feras Saied's Facebook fan page
 Saied's profile on flexonline.com

1981 births
2015 deaths
Syrian bodybuilders
Motorcycle road incident deaths
Professional bodybuilders
Road incident deaths in the United Arab Emirates
Syrian military personnel
Syrian Muslims
Syrian strength athletes
Syrian torture victims